The Thunderbird machines are a series of vehicles imagined for the mid-1960s film and television Thunderbirds series developed by Gerry Anderson. The released work began with the Supermarionation television series Thunderbirds and was followed by subsequent feature films Thunderbirds Are Go and Thunderbird 6 in 1965–68. The series featured a large variety of futuristic air, land and sea vehicles and machines, the majority of which were designed by special effects director Derek Meddings.

In the context of the series, most of the advanced machines appearing in the series belonged to the International Rescue organisation and were used during their rescues. These were known as the "Thunderbirds", of which there were five core machines and a variety of other rescue craft. It was after these that the series was named. In the series, all of the International Rescue vehicles were designed by the organisation's resident technical genius known as Brains.

The use of these models in Anderson's Supermarionation productions beginning with Supercar was a significant advance in television production. Dirt and wear was applied as a way of adding realism and countering the miniature models' toy-like appearance.

Thunderbird fleet
International Rescue's fleet consists of five principal craft; the Thunderbirds:

Thunderbird 1

Pilot: Scott Tracy
A sleek, variable geometry (swing wing) hypersonic rocket plane, blue and grey in colour, used for fast response, rescue zone reconnaissance, and as a mobile control base. Thunderbird 1 is endowed with VTOL capabilities which are demonstrated in many episodes, and its take-off from Tracy Island is most often vertical.

Thunderbird 1 is hangared beneath the main house on Tracy Island and launches vertically from a pad camouflaged by a swimming pool which slides aside.

The aircraft is primarily piloted by Scott Tracy, with Alan taking his place when he is unavailable as Thunderbirds 1 and 3 are rarely required on the same mission (such as in the episode "Atlantic Inferno", where Scott, as the eldest Tracy brother, takes charge while Jeff is on holiday). Jeff described it as "sleek, first and fast" at the beginning of Thunderbird 6.

One of the most popular errors noticed amongst Thunderbirds fans is the pilot's ability to control almost all of the many functions of the rocket by simply moving one of the two control levers forward or back. This is explained by other Thunderbirds fans as a precursor to the current system of electronic joystick controls that are backed up by sophisticated avionics computers.

As the reconnaissance craft, Thunderbird 1 featured in virtually every episode of the series as a means of assessing what vehicles would be required for a rescue. It does not appear in the episodes "Sun Probe", "The Impostors", "Ricochet" and "Give or Take a Million".

In "The Uninvited", Thunderbird 1 was shot down by the Zombite Fighters and crashed into the desert but Scott was soon found by two explorers.

Thunderbird 1 appears in the 2004 live action film Thunderbirds, where it has an updated look similar to the original; coloured silver grey, with blue and yellow detailing and red nose cone.

In the remake series Thunderbirds Are Go, Thunderbird 1 retains the same role it has in the original series. However, like all of the Thunderbirds, it is able to be piloted remotely via Scott's wrist console. Thunderbird 1 also possesses an electromagnetic cable that can be fired from the open cargo bay, allowing it to lift or tow objects. The electromagnet at the end of the cable can be swapped for a clip. It also carries a Skypod, a short-range flying capsule that allows Scott to get in close to a target where Thunderbird 1s size would be a disadvantage, and several remote operated drones that can be deployed to search multiple areas or places that cannot be reached by conventional means.

Thunderbird 2

Pilot: Virgil Tracy
Co-pilot: Gordon Tracy

Thunderbird 2 is International Rescue's heavy-duty transporter aircraft, green in colour, which carries rescue equipment to the danger zone in one of 6 pods (including Thunderbird 4 in Pod 4). Thunderbird 2 is a large, green VTOL aircraft that is used in most earth-based rescue missions. It is piloted by Virgil Tracy, who is often accompanied by either Scott Tracy, Alan Tracy, Gordon Tracy, Brains or sometimes Tin-Tin, and on at least one occasion by Lady Penelope.

It therefore arrives at the danger zone later than Thunderbird 1.

Designer Derek Meddings maintained that the forward-swept wings were a purely aesthetic decision intended to make Thunderbird 2 stand out next to real-life aircraft: "All aircraft have swept-back wings, so I thought I'd sweep mine forward." A design error on the original TB2 was corrected in later renditions. The telescopic legs which raise the craft were placed on the superstructure which prevented the pods from being loaded from a conveyor belt as seen in the original series' opening credits.

The launch sequence begins with Thunderbird 2 taxiing through a concealed hangar door disguised as a cliff face onto a runway flanked with palm trees that fall back to accommodate the large wingspan. The aircraft is then raised on a platform until it is at the correct angle for take-off. A blast shield rises at the rear of the launch ramp, channelling the exhaust of the rear engines through a series of tunnels to the other side of the island. Thunderbird 2 launches from this angle rather than using the VTOL thrusters because it is much more fuel efficient.

Thunderbird 2 is the most frequently seen of all the Thunderbirds, appearing in all but one episode of the TV series ("The Impostors") and also appearing in all three films.

In "Terror in New York City", Thunderbird 2 was fired upon and crippled by the USN Sentinel and remained out of operation for the rest of the episode. The vehicle was subsequently repaired using parts sourced from several different aircraft companies in order to protect the secrets of the aircraft's design.

In the 2004 live action film, Thunderbird 2 was given an updated design where it doesn't have a hollowed-out middle to carry any Pods, and instead, has a solid body that carries a number of Pod Vehicles within.

Thunderbird 2 features a slightly updated design (with the Pods a rectangular prism and called Modules) in the series Thunderbirds Are Go while still retaining its traditional role of the team's workhorse. The craft now features the same electromagnetic cable reels as Thunderbird 1, though they can only be used if Thunderbird 2 has no Modules attached. Like the other Thunderbirds, Thunderbird 2 can be piloted remotely via Virgil's wrist device.

The contents of Thunderbird 2s Modules differ slightly from the original series. Module 1 specialises in carrying fire-fighting equipment and contains large speakers and subwoofers topside that are used primarily to emit low-frequency sound waves for use against large fires. It also comes with two under slung liquid nitrogen cannons. Module 2 contains three "Pods," special units that can be converted and customised into a number of different rescue vehicles such as the Mole. Module 3 contains electromagnetic "grabs", large claws designed to lift objects heavier than the standard electromagnetic cables can handle. The nose of the craft also contains a set of grabs that can hold a set of seats for lifting people. Module 4 contains Thunderbird 4 just like Pod 4 did in the original series. Module 5 consists of a fuel pump to refuel other vessels as well as seats like Module 3. Module 6, like Module 4 is capable of carrying Thunderbird 4, but it is used in rare occasions of Thunderbird 2 having to travel into space.

Thunderbird 3

Astronaut: Alan Tracy or John Tracy
Co-pilots: Scott Tracy and Tin-Tin Kyrano
A reusable vertically launched SSTO (Single Stage To Orbit) spacecraft used for space rescue and maintenance of Thunderbird 5. It is red in colour. Another source says it's orange.

However, Brains, the designer of Thunderbird 3, said in a videotaped interview, that Thunderbird 3 was " in height."

Another problem with the stated size is evident in the Thunderbird 3 launch scenes.

The spacecraft uses chemical rockets for lift-off and boost, and an ion drive for propulsion while in space. Thunderbird 3 is hangared beneath the "Round House" on Tracy Island, and is primarily piloted by Alan or John Tracy, although Scott often co-pilots. Since John is usually seen in Thunderbird 5, he is rarely seen piloting the spacecraft (only in "The Mighty Atom" and "Danger at Ocean Deep" and "The Uninvited", and never in a rescue situation). In "Ricochet", Virgil is seen piloting Thunderbird 3.

This craft was used for space rescues in "Sun Probe", "Ricochet", "The Impostors" as well as escorting the Zero-X briefly in Thunderbirds Are Go.

Thunderbird 3 features a slightly different design in the series Thunderbirds Are Go. The three support structures on the engines are now grapple arms that can swing forward, which hold four electromagnetic cables each, and the nose cone of the craft holds a drill. The cockpit area is able to rotate to keep the pilot oriented "up" in relation to Earth regardless of the orientation of the rest of the craft. Like Thunderbird 2, Thunderbird 3 features a customisable Pod Vehicle in its cargo bay that's specialised for outer space rescues. Like the rest of the Thunderbirds, Thunderbird 3 can be piloted remotely via Alan's wrist device.

Thunderbird 4

Aquanaut: Gordon Tracy
This makes it the smallest of the Thunderbirds vehicles, but not the smallest of the Pod Vehicles.

A small yellow-coloured utility submersible for underwater rescue, Thunderbird 4 is carried aboard Thunderbird 2, nearly always in Pod 4, although it was once transported in Pod 6 ("Attack of the Alligators"). In the episode "Terror in New York City", the craft is launched by emergency procedure, from the Thunderbird 2 hangar and sliding along the island runway, with the runway's overhang automatically dropping into the sea as Thunderbird 4 approaches it.

Thunderbird 4s slow speed makes it impractical for the craft to travel on its own; when Thunderbird 2 was temporarily out of action and Thunderbird 4 was needed, Jeff Tracy contacted the navy vessel Sentinel - the fastest ship in the fleet and, ironically, unintentionally responsible for incapacitating Thunderbird 2 in the first place - to give Thunderbird 4 a lift to the danger zone.

The submersible is fitted with an adjustable searchlight which can be raised or lowered to reveal a variety of rescue instruments, such as cutting lasers, electromagnets, demolition rockets and battering rams, which can be extended from the nose section.

Thunderbird 4 does not play an active role in the films Thunderbirds Are Go (1966) and Thunderbird 6 (1968). It does, however, appear in the opening title sequence of Thunderbirds Are Go. In Thunderbird 6, Jeff Tracy gives a "run down" on each of the Thunderbirds machines, where Thunderbird 4 makes a brief appearance.

The submersible also appears in the 2004 live action film with an updated design, including space for two operators, larger cockpit windows, searchlights and two under-slung claws. However, it is handled by Alan Tracy instead of Gordon, because Gordon is unavailable, having been stranded along with his older brothers and father in space and unable to arrive in time.

Thunderbird 4 features a slightly updated and streamlined design in Thunderbirds Are Go and has a few new features compared to its original counterpart, now possessing a pair of deployable grapple arms and two "dry tube" evacuation pods in its stern. Like the rest of the Thunderbirds, it is able to be piloted remotely via Gordon's wrist device.

During a rescue mission on Jupiter's moon Europa in the episode "Deep Search", it was shown that Thunderbird 4 can also be transported in Thunderbird 3, although it was also provided with various new features to cope with the icy conditions on Europa. When not in use, Thunderbird 4 is housed both in one of Thunderbird 2s Modules and a water tank seen in the main Tracy Island hangar so it can launch from the island when necessary.

Thunderbird 5

Space Monitor: John Tracy or Alan Tracy
The largest rescue vehicle of the Thunderbirds inventory, which is gold, black and grey in colour, Thunderbird 5 is an Earth-orbiting space station which monitors all broadcasts around the globe for calls for help and also manages communications within International Rescue.

Thunderbird 5 is primarily commanded by John Tracy, although he is periodically relieved by Alan (according to the storyline, John and Alan swap roles once a month, one piloting Thunderbird 3 and the other monitoring Thunderbird 5, but such was writer Gerry Anderson's dislike for the character of John, that he was usually exiled to the space station). Derek Meddings designed Thunderbird 5 after the other machines and apparently based the design on the Tracy Island Roundhouse model (through which Thunderbird 3 launches).

Thunderbird 5 is electronically cloaked to avoid detection from ground-based radar or other spacecraft's sensor systems.

In the series Thunderbirds Are Go, Thunderbird 5 features the most extensive redesign of the fleet being more akin to modern day space stations. It now features a rotating habitation ring, which uses centrifugal force to provide occupants with artificial gravity. The station has a holographic computer system, also present within the Tracy home as well as the other Thunderbirds, which allows John to have face-to-face conversations with the rest of the team and display information relevant to missions. Thunderbird 5 is also equipped with a space elevator, a rocket-equipped pod on a length of cable, which lets John travel between the station and Tracy Island at will, without having to rely on Thunderbird 3. The station is also equipped with one configurable Pod vehicle. Thunderbird 5s surveillance and data technology are far more advanced compared to its original counterpart, with it able to access almost any kind of digital information that is not secured.

From the episode "EOS" onward, the station is co-operated by the artificial intelligence EOS, which has access to all of the station's systems. The entity, which was created by accident in the previous episode, "Runaway," originally had a violent sense of self-preservation extending into paranoia, which led to it seizing control of the station and attempting to kill John Tracy. However, John is able to convince it that no one is threatening it and it becomes his on-board companion, albeit with a mischievous streak.

Critical response
In a list of "Top Ten Cool Sci-Fi Vehicles", syfy.co.uk ranks Thunderbird 4 seventh.

Dr Phillip Atcliffe, an aerospace engineer based at the University of Salford, has discussed the real-world viability of the Thunderbird designs. Among his observations are wings of questionable function or value (in the case of Thunderbirds 1 and 2) and a lack of streamlining (Thunderbirds 1, 2 and 4). Atcliffe also queries how Thunderbird 3 would be able to manage its roll and states that International Rescue would probably need other space stations besides Thunderbird 5 to achieve global radio coverage.

According to Theo de Klerk, none of the Thunderbirds seem to have adequate capacity for large amounts of fuel, or turbo generators to convert the heat from their nuclear reactors. De Klerk also states that both Thunderbirds 1 and 2 would be hindered by the drag formed by their engine blocks. He adds that the single VTOL rocket in Thunderbird 1s block would provide little stability during lift-off from Tracy Island, and that given Thunderbird 2s shape, weight and short runway, it is debatable whether that craft could achieve enough lift to take off.

On Thunderbirds 3 and 5, de Klerk states that with only three main rocket engines, Thunderbird 3 could be unstable in flight, while three supporting satellites would need to be positioned around the Earth to compensate for Thunderbird 5s radio blind spots. He also notes that the crew of Thunderbird 3 apparently do not lie on their backs for lift-off, despite the increased G-force of space launches, and that while both Thunderbirds 3 and 5 produce artificial gravity for their occupants, it is unclear how. De Klerk considers Thunderbird 4 to have the least practical design of the fleet, stating that its non-cylindrical shape makes it ill-adapted to extreme underwater pressures.

Other International Rescue vehicles

Thunderbird 2 Pod Vehicles
Thunderbird 2 carries specialised rescue vehicles and equipment to disaster sites in one of six interchangeable Pods. The "Pod Vehicles" are stored within the aircraft's cavernous hangar or kept on standby within the Pods themselves. In the series Thunderbirds Are Go, the Pods Vehicles can be converted and customised into a number of different rescue vehicles for different uses.

Booster Mortar (a.k.a. the Thunderiser): a tracked vehicle with a cannon that can fire rescue packs through upper-floor windows to assist people trapped in tall buildings. Used in "Edge of Impact".
DOMO (Demolition and Object Moving Operator): a restraint vehicle with three suction arms that, by using artificial gravity fields can restrain or lift unstable structures or clear the disaster zone of heavy objects prior to the use of other Pod Vehicles. Used in "The Duchess Assignment", in which it is referred to as the "Restraining Outfit".
Elevator Cars: built for use at airports to enable stricken aircraft to land safely by way of being manoeuvred beneath a plane to act as a substitute for landing gear. Used in "Trapped in the Sky".
Excavator: a high-powered rock-crushing machine similar in design to the DOMO. It is used to clear rough terrain or unblock caves with people trapped inside, often being used for areas affected by landslides. Used in "Martian Invasion".
Fire Tender: an adapted commercial vehicle that serves as a backup to the Firefly and Fire Truck.
Fire Truck: a fire-fighting vehicle that shoots water, foam and nitroglycerine shells to extinguish blazes. Used in "Security Hazard".
Firefly: a fire-proof vehicle used for demolition and fire-fighting work. Used in "City of Fire" and "Terror in New York City".
Jet Air Transporter: an air-cushioned vehicle which uses a combination of high-power vertical turbo fans and anti-gravity technology to allow people jumping from buildings or structures to be caught safely and gently lowered to the ground. Used in "Moveand You're Dead".
Laser Cutter Vehicle: a tracked vehicle similar in design to the Booster Mortar. Equipped with a powerful front-mounted laser that can gain precise and rapid entry to secure buildings such as vaults and bunkers. Used in "30 Minutes After Noon".
Mobile Crane: a six-wheeled cherry picker vehicle used primarily to lift rescue personnel into tall structures. Used in "Path of Destruction".
The Mole: a high-speed subterrene tunnelling machine capable of boring through even the hardest rock to rescue individuals trapped underground. It is carried to rescue sites on a trolley then tilts to commence drilling. Caterpillar tracks on both sides enable it to return to the surface. Used in "Pit of Peril", "City of Fire" and "The Duchess Assignment". It is notable for being one of the few Pod Vehicles to appear in multiple episodes; it also appears in the closing credits alongside the five Thunderbirds, Fireflash and FAB 1. 
Monobrake: a low-slung search and recovery utility vehicle capable of either travelling along monorail tunnels or, by using its front-mounted telescopic arm, can be attached to an overhead monorail line for greater speed. Used in the episode "The Perils of Penelope". 
Neutraliser Tractor: a tracked mobile device used primarily to disable the radio control systems and electronics of explosive devices through use of sonic waves. Used in "Moveand You're Dead".
Recovery Vehicles: one manned and one remote-controlled vehicle equipped with magnetic grappling lines to haul large objects out of lakes, rivers or pits. Used in "Pit of Peril".
Thunderbird 4: although a Thunderbird in its own right, Thunderbird 4 usually transported to a rescue in Pod 4 of Thunderbird 2. It is the most frequently seen of the Pod Vehicles.
Transmitter Truck: adapted from a heavy-duty commercial vehicle and equipped with a dish that can transmit tractor beams and safety beams as well as communications and computer data to inaccessible locations. Used in "Sun Probe".

Thunderbird 6

In the film Thunderbird 6 (1968), Jeff Tracy tasks Brains with designing a sixth Thunderbird vehicle. Brains sees all of his proposals rejected, but after Alan Tracy's restored de Havilland Tiger Moth plays a vital role in saving the occupants of the stricken airship Skyship One, he successfully pitches the biplane as the new "Thunderbird 6".

Thunderbird Shadow

Thunderbird Shadow (or Thunderbird S) is the newest addition to International Rescue's fleet of vehicles in the 2015 reboot series Thunderbirds Are Go.

Black in colour, it is a highly agile, VTOL-capable hypersonic stealth aircraft piloted by the organisation's Chief of Security Tanusha "Kayo" Kyrano. It is primarily used for covert operations related to protecting International Rescue as well as support for land and air-based rescues. The cockpit section doubles as a high speed "Shadow Bike" motorcycle which can be dropped to the ground from the craft's fuselage when aerial pursuit becomes impractical while remaining in remote control contact. The ship features a pair of grappling claws in place of traditional landing gear, allowing it to perch on walls, ceilings, and other vehicles. The claws have also been used to carry cargo. Additionally, Thunderbird Shadow is equipped with electromagnetic cables, a sonic cannon, and stealth mode "optical camouflage" cloaking technology, allowing it to appear invisible to the naked eye and radar. It can also launch electronic disabling devices onto vehicles in order to take control of them when in range.

Thunderbird Shadows launch area on Tracy Island is located on a rock outcrop in a hangar shared with Thunderbirds 1, 3 and 4. Once Kayo is geared up in her flight suit, she ascends to the main body of the ship in the Shadow Bike. The craft is then carried backwards on a turntable and up a wall via a rail. The turntable then rotates 180 degrees so the nose faces up, just as the wall flips round to take the ship outdoors (the exterior is disguised as a rock façade of the island). Thunderbird Shadow takes off from there.

Thunderbird Shadow was designed by Shōji Kawamori, best known as the creator and mechanical designer of the Macross franchise.

Vehicles owned by Lady Penelope

FAB 1: a six-wheeled Rolls-Royce pink motor car used by Lady Penelope and her chauffeur, Parker. The car has an aircraft-style canopy and is fitted with many gadgets including an air-cooled machine gun located behind the Rolls-Royce grille. 
FAB 2: Penelope's yacht which featured in the episode "The Man from MI.5". Parker seemingly lost the vessel after using it as currency in a game of poker. It also makes an appearance in the Thunderbirds Are Go episode "Upside Down".
FAB 0: a six-wheeled motor car that appears in the Thunderbirds Are Go episode "Designated Driver" as the vehicle that precedes FAB 1. It resembles the original FAB 1 from the original Thunderbirds series and additionally features propellers housed in its wheels for flight.
In the 2004 live-action film, Penelope also owned a number of pink Ford cars, at least one of which was named "FAB-8".

Miscellaneous
Hover bikes: small personal transports that hover above the ground, used by all members of IR. These vehicles were also seen in Anderson's earlier series Fireball XL5. They were used to get around the fact that the puppeteers could not make the marionettes walk realistically. They also make an appearance in the 2004 film and the Thunderbirds Are Go episode "Home on the Range".
Ladybird Jet: Tin-Tin's jet seen in two episodes of Thunderbirds, and appears as a piece in the Thunderbirds game "Tracy Island" expansion pack.
Remote Camera: a remotely-operated flying camera designed to withstand extreme heat. Also carried aboard Thunderbird 1.

Other vehicles

Crablogger

This huge yellow tree-felling machine was featured in the episode "Path of Destruction". The Crablogger is powered by a nuclear reactor, but its built-in wood processing plant requires the chemical fuel 'Superon'. It was designed by Jim Lucas of Robotics International in England. The machine was equipped with two large arms with a giant central chainsaw which would cut a tree at the base before passing it through an opening at the front. Inside the Crablogger's processing plant, the tree was reduced to wood pulp which was regularly collected by tankers.

Designed to clear areas of forestation to make way for road developments, much of the Crablogger's systems were automated, although a crew was required to monitor these systems. In the episode "Path of Destruction", the crew were incapacitated by food poisoning, resulting in the machine going out of control.

Fireflash

The Fireflash, a hypersonic airliner, appeared in the episodes "Trapped in the Sky", "Operation Crash-Dive", "The Impostors", "The Man from MI.5" and "The Duchess Assignment", as well as in a flashback sequence in "Security Hazard". It has six atomic motors that enable it to stay in the air for a maximum of six months; however, their radiation shielding must be maintained frequently, or the passengers will be able to spend a maximum of only three hours in the aircraft before suffering lethal radiation sickness.

The craft weighs 1,806 tons, has a wingspan of 180 feet, is 380 feet in length, and its maximum speed is Mach 6 (approximately 4,500 mph or 7,200 km/h), and it can fly at heights above . A novel feature is that the flight deck is built into the tail fin. Like many in real life, this aircraft has two decks, but also features luxury facilities such as a cocktail lounge housed within glazed sections of the wings' leading edges. Fireflash was commissioned by Air Terrainean (a.k.a. Terrainean Airways).

Helijets
Multi-purpose jet-powered VTOL aircraft, helijets appear in numerous episodes and are widely used by civilian and military organisations. A variety of different designs are seen over the course of the series and were also seen in Anderson's next series Captain Scarlet and the Mysterons. Some versions seem to be based on the fuselage design of the Kaman HH-43 Huskie helicopter of the early 1960s. It is assumed that the production team modellers modified commercial plastic models (probably the 1/32 scale Hawk kit) of the helicopter for use in the series.

Martian Space Probe
Appearing in the episode "Day of Disaster", the Martian Space Probe is an automated mini-rocket designed by Professor Wingrove and built to rival the Zero-X project. Due to the position of Mars, it was shipped over to England to take off. En route to its launch site, the Allington suspension bridge collapsed under its weight, sending the rocket to the bottom of the river. The intervention of International Rescue saved two technicians inside the command module, but the spacecraft's main body was destroyed.

Ocean Pioneer
Ocean Pioneer was a class of ocean-going nuclear powered tanker which carried liquid alsterene. Ocean Pioneer I was destroyed by an explosion after chemical reaction of her cargo with OD-60 gas in the Mediterranean Sea, there were no survivors. Ocean Pioneer II suffered the same fate; however, International Rescue saved all three crew members. Both vessels featured in the episode "Danger at Ocean Deep".

Red Arrow

The Red Arrow is a fighter jet seen in "Edge of Impact". It has outstanding manoeuvrability, rate of climb, and speed courtesy of being powered by "twin rockets", which Jeff describes as a "new field". The first two of this aircraft were destroyed by the Hood for General Bron, a military leader from a rogue state. The model appears to be based on a SAAB Draken, dressed up with four extra jet engines.

USN Sentinel

A next-generation United States Navy strike vessel that appeared in the episode "Terror in New York City". The warship is 720 feet long, has a beam of 98 feet, and a displacement of 51,270 tons. Unfortunately, the Sentinel also detected Thunderbird 2 and launched a missile attack, having erroneously identified Thunderbird 2 as an enemy aircraft since it was too slow to be a missile, too fast to be a civilian aircraft and did not match any U.S. military aircraft.

Although the Sentinel was prevented from fully destroying Thunderbird 2 when an identification signal was transmitted at the last minute, the damage sustained to the craft's engines crippled it for the rest of the episode. Subsequently, the Sentinel helped International Rescue to save some reporters from drowning in an underwater river in New York by taking Thunderbird 4 aboard and carrying it near the city, as Sentinel was the only available craft capable of transporting Thunderbird 4 that was fast enough to take it to the city in time to make a difference.

Sidewinder

A United States Army walking vehicle that appeared in the episode "Pit of Peril". It resembles a giant beetle. Powered by an atomic reactor, the four-legged Sidewinder has two mechanical arms at the front which are used to uproot trees and move aside other obstructions. The vehicle is operated by a crew of three from the cabin at the front.

The vehicle was developed to prevent South African "brushfire wars" from escalating into larger conflicts and is equipped with a significant amount of weaponry.

The prototype vehicle fell into an unmapped landfill pit during testing. Due to spontaneous combustion of the rubbish, the inside of the pit was extremely hot. Later versions of it were equipped with emergency anti-gravity generators for use in similar situations or if one of its legs has been damaged.

Skyship One

Skyship One is a large technologically advanced airship which appeared in the second Thunderbirds feature film, Thunderbird 6. Commissioned by the New World Aircraft Corporation, the airship was designed by Thunderbirds creator Brains under the pseudonym of "Mr X". The ship requires only a skeleton crew, as the systems are entirely automated, with destinations pre-programmed before take-off. Key to the airship's design are the gravity compensators; incorporating technology developed for Thunderbird 5, they effectively reduce the airship's weight allowing it to become airborne. Inside, the cabins and facilities are luxurious and include several themed rooms and bars.

Skythrust

A large, supersonic passenger airliner designed by Brains (although he claims that he only designed some of its new experimental features) which featured in the episode "Alias Mr. Hackenbacker". It is considered the safest aircraft in service, largely due to its unique safety feature in the form of an ejectable fuel tank. In the event of a crash landing, the fuel tank separates from the main body of the aircraft, allowing the plane to land safely with minimal risk of fire or explosion. The fuel "rocket" is then guided to a safe altitude before self-destructing.

Sun Probe

The Sun Probe is a rocket that was sent to collect a sample from the Sun for research purposes. However, the radiation from the Sun caused the retro-rockets to fail, resulting in it going on a collision course with the Sun until Thunderbird 3 was able to activate the rockets by remote.

It first featured in the eponymous "Sun Probe" and (briefly) in the later produced episode "The Perils of Penelope".

Zero-X

A metallic-blue spacecraft that made the first manned landing on Mars. Zero-X first appeared in the first Thunderbirds feature film, Thunderbirds Are Go, and subsequently in the first episode of Captain Scarlet and the Mysterons. It is assembled hours prior to launch and consists of five parts: the Martian Excursion Vehicle (MEV; later renamed the Martian Exploration Vehicle); the main fuselage; Lifting Body 1 and 2, two wing-like structures that are loaded with thruster packs and also incorporate landing gear at the ends; and a reflective nose cone, which attaches to the MEV.

Zero-XL
Zero-XL was the designation given to the solar system deep exploration and rescue spaceship, powered by a fully functioning T-Drive engine. Designed and built by Brains and the Mechanic, its sole purpose was to travel to the Oort Cloud in order to rescue Jeff Tracy. The Zero-XL has multiple docking capabilities which facilitates Thunderbirds 1, 2, 3, and 5 docking simultaneously.

References

Works cited

Further reading

 – Thunderbird 5.

External links
Gerry Anderson's "Stars"overview of the miniature models of the Anderson series, including Thunderbirds (archived 15 January 2008)

Fictional elements introduced in 1965
Fictional vehicles by work
Machines